Thrill is a 2008 Indian Malayalam-language film directed by B Venugopal starring newcomers. The film follows a group of youngsters who are willing to do anything for money.

Cast

 Satya Prakash as Rahul
 Anoop Kumar as Aneesh Thampan
Saradha
 Prajoosha 
Pooja Vijayan
 Anil Murali
 Augustine
 Baburaj
Kanakalatha
 Ramesh 
Sreekutty

Reception
Nowrunning wrote that "Yet another supposedly gripping time-killer. Yet another plot filled with holes wide enough for you to fall through. Yet another miserable opportunity to squander away one and a half hours of your life". Indiaglitz wrote that "If you are wholly prepared for the amazing, unrelenting horridness of a movie, just have a watch. It will certainly better your patience levels, with the ample display of  stupidity and lunacy".

References

External links

2008 films
2000s Malayalam-language films